Hurunui may refer to:

Hurunui District, New Zealand
Hurunui (New Zealand electorate)
Hurunui River, New Zealand
Hurunui Windfarm
Hurunui, New Zealand, a settlement in Hurunui District